The Land of Lakes Choirboys is a nonprofit boy choir organization based in Elk River, Minnesota. Consisting of four individual choir ensembles, the organization performs in local, national, and international locations. Through a series of training programs, choristers are taught arts of music, leadership, respect, honor and other elements of human integrity. Known for singing works of various musicians such as Bach and Antonio Vivaldi, the choristers sing religious and secular music.

History 
Land of Lakes Choirboys was founded by Craig Carmody-Anderson in 1976. It consisted of a single choir and depended on the community and a school building to support choir events. Beginning with eighteen members and conducted by Anderson himself, the organization continued to grow. Deciding it was important to perform for different audiences, the Choir purchased a motor coach in 1984. This allowed the Choir to conduct tours and provide transportation. To compensate for limited space, the Choir purchased several acres of land and an old schoolhouse building near Elk River, Minnesota in 1991. This is where the organization functioned, holding its choir rehearsals and activities.

To create its own unique sound, the Choir began searching for a new conductor. Born in New Zealand, Francis Stockwell was hired. Stockwell was a music director at a school in Switzerland and had experience working with the Vienna Boys' Choir. The Choir then established a second ensemble that was used to train choristers until they were invited into the touring choir. Anderson directed the training choir while Stockwell directed the touring choir.

In 2002, the State of Minnesota ordered the condemnation of the choir's land to construct a highway overpass. Rehearsals and activities were temporarily held inside of a local church building, until the choir purchased a facility near St. Francis, Minnesota. Through time, the choir grew large enough for the organization to hire Aaron Carpenter. Carpenter took the direction of two new training choirs and later the national touring choir.

In February 2010, one of their former choirboys took over as executive director. P.J. Fanberg was a choirboy from 1994 to 1997. In the winter of 2011, Stockwell and Anderson left the group. After the departure of Stockwell, associate director Aaron Carpenter was promoted to the position of artistic director. Carpenter then brought on two associate directors, Corinne Anderson and Taylor Quinn. In 2013, the choir sold its property in St. Francis and moved back into the heart of Elk River, MN now sharing a rehearsal and office space with Elk River Lutheran Church on Main Street. Carpenter also was appointed executive director to replace the outgoing Fanberg. In 2018, Quinn left. In 2020, former choirboy Grady Klien has joined as an associate director.

Ensembles

Training choirs

The Prep Choir (Cantare) is the first, but optional stage in vocal training. This choir features boys aged five, six, and seven. Conducted by Anderson, these boys are introduced to singing through movement, acting and unison song. They perform twice every year and rehearse for a short time once every week.
The Training Choir (Cantanti) features boys aged 8–12. These boys are taught the basics of singing, breathing, note reading and vocal production. Choristers are conducted by Klien and often perform with Concertare.

Touring Choirs
The Concert Choir (Concertare) features boys aged 8–18. Conducted by Carpenter, these choristers rehearse twice every week and have one personal voice lesson per month. They are introduced to further vocal development and perform for national and international audiences.

For the Man's Voice
Land of Lakes Men's Chorus (Cambiata), features boys from previous choirs whose voices have changed, as well as their fathers and men from the community. This choir works to develop the changed voice and sings with the Concertare as well as alone.  It is under the direction of Carpenter.

Awards
 The only boys’ choir outside of Germany to have received the honor of opening the International Bach Festival in Ratingen, Germany, in June 1999, with a full concert.
 Winner of the 2004 International Trebby Award for 'Best Boys’ Choir Album” with its CD “Steal Away.
 2006 Grand Champion of Cruise Festivals Music Festivals.
 Winner of the Gold diploma in the qualifying around in Category 1 (Children's choirs) at the 5th World Choir Games in Graz, Austria; July, 2008
 Winner of the Gold diploma in the qualifying around in Category 17 (Sacred Music) at the 5th World Choir Games in Graz, Austria; July, 2008
 Winner of the silver medal in the competition round in Category 1 (Children's choirs) at the 5th World Choir Games in Graz, Austria; July, 2008
 Winner of the silver medal in the competition round in Category 17 (Sacred Music) at the 5th World Choir Games in Graz, Austria; July, 2008
 Inducted into the Minnesota Music Hall of Fame, the only Minnesota Children's Choir with such an honor; November, 2009
 2010 Grand Champion of Cruise Festivals Music Festivals.

References

External links 
 
 LOLCB at treble.info

Choirs of children
Musical groups from Minnesota
Musical groups established in 1976
Choirs in Minnesota
1976 establishments in Minnesota